The Asian University Athletics Championships was an international athletics competition for student athletes from Asian countries. It was staged on one occasion in November 2005 at the Guangdong Olympic Stadium in Guangzhou, China. A total of 19 nations competed, including Russian athletes from the Far Eastern Federal University in Vladivostok.

Medal summary

Men

Women

References

2005 in athletics (track and field)
2005 in Chinese sport
2005 in Asian sport
November 2005 sports events in Asia
Student sports competitions
Athletics competitions in Asia
Sports competitions in Guangzhou
Defunct athletics competitions